The Wielangta forest is in south-east Tasmania, Australia. It is notable for its role in a 2006 court case that called into question the effectiveness of Australia's cooperative Commonwealth-State forest management regime known as Regional Forest Agreements.

Name 
Wielangta is an Aboriginal name of high trees.

Environment
The Wielangta forest is part of remnant glacial refugia forest and contains blue gum eucalypt forest and pockets of cool temperate rainforest.  The forest is a key habitat of rare and threatened species, including the Tasmanian wedge-tailed eagle, swift parrot, Wielangta stag beetle, spotted-tail quoll and eastern barred bandicoot. A rare orchid (Genoplesium nudum) has also been discovered in the forest.  The forest forms part of the South-east Tasmania Important Bird Area, identified as such by BirdLife International because of its importance in the conservation of a range of woodland birds.

Logging controversy
The forest is under the control of Forestry Tasmania, with logging being allowed.  The logging of the forest has been contentious due to the impact on rare and threatened species. Environmentalists called for the Wielangta forest area to be incorporated into a broader reserve offering full protection to environmental and biodiversity values. Some parts of Wielangta were granted formal protection in the recent Supplementary Regional Forest Agreement (Tasmania).

In 2006 Australian Greens Senator, Bob Brown, took the issue of Forestry Tasmania's failure to protect endangered species in Wielangta to the Federal Court, particularly the Tasmanian wedge-tailed eagle, broad-toothed stag beetle and swift parrot.  His case was initially successful, establishing that forestry activities were impacting on those species, but an appeal by Forestry Tasmania on the interpretation of a part of the agreement was successful.  In February 2007, the Tasmanian State Government and the Australian Federal Government responded by changing the text of the State's Regional Forest Agreement and making further legal appeals pointless. The new clauses make it clear that the word 'protection' relates only to whether the two respective governments deem a species to be protected rather than the meaning of the word being based on actual evidence of such.

In June 2009 Brown received a bill from Forestry Tasmania for the costs of the case and of the appeals. After a public appeal for assistance he declared he would be able to make the payment by the deadline and not risk losing his seat in the Australian Senate.

Wielangta tram 

Its steam locomotive had been built by Russell Allport & Co in Hobart.

In its heyday Wielangta had several sawmills, a general store, a bakery, a blacksmith and a school.  The sawmill settlement was inhabited by about a hundred pioneers. They worked there from 1911 to 1924, before the sawmill was closed due to the lack of wood in the area and the workers moved on. The settlement was devastated by bushfires in the 1920s and abandoned in 1928.

References

External links
 Wielangta Forest Drive Forestry Tasmania
 Bob Brown vs Forestry Tasmania trial

Tasmanian forests
Important Bird Areas of Tasmania
Logging railways in Australia